The 2019 Minnesota Golden Gophers football team represented the University of Minnesota in the 2019 NCAA Division I FBS football season. The Golden Gophers played their home games at TCF Bank Stadium in Minneapolis, Minnesota, and competed in the West Division of the Big Ten Conference. They were led by third-year head coach P. J. Fleck.

Minnesota was projected to finish in sixth place in the Big Ten West Division by the preseason media poll. Instead, Minnesota had its most successful season in over 50 years. The Gophers won their first nine games of the year, punctuated with a home win over then-No. 4 Penn State, and rose to eighth in the College Football Playoff rankings. They suffered their first loss of the year the next week on the road against Iowa. In the final game of the regular season, in a game that decided the West Division, Minnesota lost to rival Wisconsin, 38–17. The team was invited to the Outback Bowl to play then-No. 12 Auburn, where Minnesota won by a score of 31–24. Minnesota ended the season with a record of 11–2, their 11 wins being the school's most since 1904. They were ranked 10th in the final AP Poll of the season, their first ranked finish since 2003, and highest finish since 1962.

The Gophers' offense was led by redshirt sophomore quarterback Tanner Morgan, who had 3,253 passing yards and 30 touchdowns, and was named second-team All-Big Ten. Wide receivers Rashod Bateman and Tyler Johnson both finished with more than 1,200 yards and were both named first-team all-conference. Running back Rodney Smith finished in third in the conference with 1,163 yards. The defense was led by first-team all-conference safety Antoine Winfield Jr., who led the team in tackles and had seven interceptions on the year. Head coach P. J. Fleck was named the Big Ten Coach of the Year by the other coaches.

Previous season
The Golden Gophers finished the 2018 season 7–6, 3–6 in Big Ten play to finish tied for fifth place in the West Division. They were invited to the Quick Lane Bowl, where they defeated Georgia Tech.

Preseason

Preseason Big Ten poll
Although the Big Ten Conference has not held an official preseason poll since 2010, Cleveland.com has polled sports journalists representing all member schools as a de facto preseason media poll since 2011. For the 2019 poll, Minnesota was projected to finish in sixth in the West Division.

Schedule 

Source:

Rankings

Game summaries

South Dakota State

Down 1, the Gophers won the game with a short TD run by Mohamed Ibrahim and a two point conversion late in the 4th Quarter to win 28–21.

at Fresno State

Georgia Southern

at Purdue

Illinois

Nebraska

at Rutgers

Maryland

Penn State

at Iowa

at Northwestern

Wisconsin

vs. Auburn (Outback Bowl)

Despite losing an opportunity to go to the BIG 10 Championship and a shot at the Rose Bowl, the Gophers would earn a spot in the Outback Bowl on New Year's Day against the Auburn Tigers,  the first ever meeting between the two teams. The game would be played at Raymond James Stadium in Tampa Bay, Florida. Auburn had impressive victories in their season, beating the Pac-12 champion Oregon Ducks in Texas to open the season and more recently knocking off the Alabama Crimson Tide in the Iron Bowl. The game was a back and forth affair with both teams trading field goals then touchdowns to make it 10–10 after the 1st Quarter. The lone Gopher 1st quarter touchdown came from Mohamed Ibrahim on a 16 yard TD run. About midway through the second, Seth Green found offensive lineman Bryce Witham in the end zone to give the Gophers a 17–10 lead, their first lead of the game. After Bo Nix connected with Sal Cannella for a 37 yard score, the Gophers would end the half with a drive that ultimately ended with an impressive Tyler Johnson touchdown reception to give them a 24–17 lead. Auburn would score the only points of the 3rd Quarter as Jordan Whitlow ran a touchdown in from three yards out. Finally, Tyler Johnson finished his final collegiate game with a 73 yard touchdown catch and run in the 4th Quarter to give Minnesota the lead. It would be the deciding score as the Gophers stopped the Tigers on their final drive to win the Outback Bowl 31–24.

Roster

Players drafted into the NFL

References

Minnesota
Minnesota Golden Gophers football seasons
ReliaQuest Bowl champion seasons
Minnesota Golden Gophers football